The fifty euro note (€50) is one of the middle value euro banknotes and has been used since the introduction of the euro (in its cash form) in 2002. The note is used by some 343 million Europeans and in the 25 countries which have the euro as their sole currency (with 23 legally adopting it). In December 2022, there were about 14,430,000,000 fifty euro banknotes in circulation in the eurozone. It is by far the most widely circulated denomination, accounting for almost half (49.0%) of the total banknotes. Estimates suggest that the average life of a fifty euro banknote is about four years before it is replaced due to wear.

It is the fourth smallest note, measuring 140 mm × 77 mm, and has an orange colour scheme. The note depicts bridges and arches/doorways in the Renaissance era (15th and 16th centuries). The €50 note contains several complex security features such as watermarks, invisible ink, holograms and microprinting that document its authenticity.

The full design of the Europa series €50 banknote was revealed on 5 July 2016. The new 50 note was released on 4 April 2017.

History 

The euro was founded on 1 January 1999, when it became the currency of over 300 million people in Europe. For the first three years of its existence it was an invisible currency, only used in accounting. Euro cash was not introduced until 1 January 2002, when it replaced the national banknotes and coins of the 12 countries in the eurozone, such as the Dutch guilder and the Portuguese escudo.
Today, the €50 note is used by some 332 million Europeans and in the 22 countries which have it as their sole currency (with 20 legally adopting it).

Slovenia joined the Eurozone in 2007, Cyprus and Malta in 2008, Slovakia in 2009, Estonia in 2011, Latvia in 2014, and Lithuania in 2015.

The changeover period 
The changeover period during which the former currencies' notes and coins were exchanged for those of the euro lasted about two months, from 1 January 2002 until 28 February 2002. The official date on which the national currencies ceased to be legal tender varied from member state to member state. The earliest date was in Germany, where the mark officially ceased to be legal tender on 31 December 2001, though the exchange period lasted for two months more. Even after the old currencies ceased to be legal tender, they continue to be accepted by national central banks for periods ranging from ten years to forever.

Changes 
Notes printed before November 2003 bear the signature of the first president of the European Central Bank, Wim Duisenberg. He was succeeded on 1 November 2003 by Jean-Claude Trichet, whose signature appears on issues from November 2003 to March 2012. Notes issued after March 2012 bear the signature of the third president of the European Central Bank, incumbent Mario Draghi.

The first series issues do not reflect the expansion of the European Union, as Cyprus is not depicted on the notes as the map does not extend far enough east, and Malta is also missing as it does not meet the current series' minimum size for depiction.

Since the European Central Bank plans to redesign the notes every seven or eight years after each issue, a new 50 note was put into circulation on 4 April 2017. New production and anti-counterfeiting techniques are employed on the new notes, but the basic design remained on the same theme (bridges and arches) and continues to use colours identical to the previous series. However, the new note is visibly distinguishable from the old one.

Design 

The fifty euro note is the fourth smallest note, measuring  × , with an orange colour scheme. Each euro banknote depicts bridges and arches/doorways in a different historical European style; the €50 note shows the Renaissance era (15th and 16th centuries). Although Robert Kalina's original designs were intended to show real monuments, for political reasons the bridge and the window are merely hypothetical examples of the architectural era.

Like all euro notes, the €50 note shows the denomination, the EU flag, the signature of the president of the ECB, the initials of the ECB in the different EU languages, a depiction of EU territories overseas, the stars from the EU flag and various security features.

Security features (first series)

The fifty euro note contains the following security features:

 Colour changing ink used on the numeral located on the back of the note, that appears to change colour from purple to brown, when the note is tilted.
 A see through number printed in the top corner of the note, on both sides, appear combine perfectly to form the value numeral when held against the light.
 A hologram, used on the note which appears to see the hologram image change between the value and a window or doorway, but in the background, it appears to be rainbow-coloured concentric circles of micro-letters moving from the centre to the edges of the patch. 
 A EURion constellation; the EURion constellation is a pattern of symbols found on a number of banknote designs worldwide since about 1996. It is added to help software detect the presence of a banknote in a digital image.
 Watermarks, which appear when held up to the light.
 Raised printing in the main image, the lettering and the value numerals on the front of the banknotes will be raised.
 Ultraviolet ink; the paper itself does not glow, fibres embedded in the paper do appear, and be coloured red, blue and green, the EU flag is green and has orange stars, the ECB President's, currently Mario Draghi's, signature turns green, the large stars and small circles on the front glow and the European map, a bridge and the value numeral on the back appear in yellow.
 Microprinting, on various areas of the banknotes there is microprinting, for example, inside the "ΕΥΡΩ" (EURO in Greek characters) on the front. The micro-text is sharp, but not blurred.
 A security thread, embedded in the banknote paper. The thread will appear as a dark stripe when held up to the light. The word "EURO" and the value is embedded in tiny letters on the thread.
 Perforations in the hologram which will form the euro symbol. There are also small numbers showing the value.
 A matted surface; the note paper is made out of pure cotton, which feels crisp and firm, but not limp or waxy.
 Barcodes,
 A serial number.

Security features (Europa series)
 Watermark: When the note is held under a normal light source, a portrait of Europa and an electrotype denomination appear on either side.
 Portrait Window: When the note is held against the light, the window in the hologram becomes transparent and reveals a portrait of Europa which is visible on both sides of the note.
 Portrait Hologram: When the note is tilted, the hologram – the silver-coloured stripe on the right of the note – reveals a portrait of Europa as well as the "€" symbol, the main image and the value of the banknote.
 Emerald Number: When the note is tilted, the number "50" on the bottom left corner of the note displays an effect of the light that moves up and down. The number "50" also changes colour from emerald green to deep blue.
 Security Thread: When the note is held to the light, the security thread appears as a dark line. The "€" symbol and the value of the note can be seen in tiny white lettering in the stripe.
 Microprinting: Some areas of the banknote feature a series of tiny letters. The microprinting can be read with a magnifying glass. The letters are sharp, not blurred.

Circulation 

The European Central Bank closely monitors the circulation and stock of the euro coins and banknotes. It is a task of the Eurosystem to ensure an efficient and smooth supply of euro notes and to maintain their integrity throughout the euro area.

In December 2022, there were  €50 banknotes in circulation around the Eurozone. with a total value of €. This is the number of banknotes issued by the Eurosystem central banks, without any distinction as to who is holding the currency issued, thus also including the stocks held by credit institutions.

The figures are as follows (Nov. 3, 2017) :

On 4 April 2017, a new 'Europe' series was issued.

The first series of notes were issued in conjunction with those for a few weeks in the series 'Europe' until existing stocks are exhausted, then gradually withdrawn from circulation. Both series thus run parallel but the proportion tends inevitably to a sharp decrease in the first series.

The latest figures provided by the ECB are the following :

Legal information 
Legally, both the European Central Bank and the central banks of the eurozone countries have the right to issue the 7 different euro banknotes. In practice, only the national central banks of the zone physically issue and withdraw euro banknotes. The European Central Bank does not have a cash office and is not involved in any cash operations.

Tracking 
There are several communities of people at European level, such as EuroBillTracker, that keep track of the euro banknotes that pass through their hands, as a hobby. The aim is to keep track of the places to which the banknotes travel: how they spread, from where and to where they travel in general, and generate statistics and rankings, for example, in which countries there are more banknotes. EuroBillTracker has registered over 161 million notes as of November 2016, worth a total of more than €3 billion.

References

External links 
 

Euro banknotes
Fifty-base-unit banknotes